Foster's Home for Imaginary Friends (often abbreviated to Foster's) is an American animated television series created by Craig McCracken that ran from August 13, 2004, to May 3, 2009, on Cartoon Network. Throughout its run, it was nominated for 33 television and animation industry awards and won 12 of them. It received 20 Annie Award nominations, including Best Animated Television Production in 2006, of which it won 5. Two specials ("Good Wilt Hunting" and "Destination: Imagination") were nominated for the Primetime Emmy Award for "Outstanding Animated Program (For Programming One Hour or More)," which the latter won. Eight other nominations and six other wins were given to the series at other Emmy ceremonies.

At the 2005 Pulcinella Awards, Foster's Home for Imaginary Friends won the award for "Best TV Series for All Audiences" and the main character Bloo won "Best Character of the Year." It was nominated for the Television Critics Association Award for "Outstanding Achievement in Children's Programming" in 2006. The episode "Squeeze the Day" won the award for "Best Television Animation for Children" at the 2007 Ottawa International Animation Festival. The entertainment website IGN listed Foster's as the 85th greatest animated television program of all time. Zap2it placed Eduardo, one of the main characters from the series, number seven on their list of "Underrated of 2006."

Annie Awards

The Annie Awards are award ceremonies honoring "excellence in the field of animation" and are presented by the International Animated Film Society. Foster's Home for Imaginary Friends has been nominated for 20 Annie Awards, winning 5.

Emmy Awards

Emmy Awards are the "[television] equivalent of the Oscars" and are awarded for excellence in television programs. The Emmys are presented by three sister organizations: Academy of Television Arts & Sciences, National Academy of Television Arts & Sciences, and International Academy of Television Arts & Sciences. Foster's has been nominated for ten Emmy Awards, winning seven.

References

External links

 

Lists of awards by animated television series
Awards And Nominations